Ahmed Sharful Hossain, also known as Shariful Islam, is a Bangladesh Army officer and a fugitive involved in the assassination of President Sheikh Mujibur Rahman and the Jail Killing.

Career
Some mid-ranking officers in the Bangladesh Army launched the 15 August 1975 Bangladesh coup d'état that resulted in the assassination of Sheikh Mujibur Rahman, the President of Bangladesh, and formation of the government led by Khondaker Mostaq Ahmad. The coup was led by officers from the artillery and lancer units of Bangladesh Army. Ahmed Sharful Hossain was then a major in the lancer unit. He was part of the unofficial command council formed in the Gonobhaban (President's office) that ruled the country after the coup. He left Bangladesh along with other coup plotters on 4 November 1975 when a counter coup was launched. On 4 November 1975 national leaders AHM Qamaruzzaman, M Mansur Ali, Syed Nazrul Islam, and Tajuddin Ahmed were killed by the coup members before they left Bangladesh.

Hossain was appointed a diplomat by the new Bangladesh government led by President Ziaur Rahman. He was posted in Senegal as the Bangladesh counsellor. He also served in Bangladesh Embassies in Saudi Arabia and Oman.

Hossain was an accused in the Jail killing case filed on 4 November 1975 by Kazi Abdul Awal, the deputy inspector general of Prison. Investigation in the case did not start till 1996 when Bangladesh Awami League returned to power led by Sheikh Hasina, the daughter of Sheikh Mujibur Rahman. On 15 October 1998 the case was brought to trial. In October 2004 Dhaka metropolitan sessions judge's court sentenced Hossain and 11 others to life imprisonment and 3 others to death. Bangladesh High Court on 28 August 2008 upheld his sentence while acquitting six of the convicts. The Appellate Division upheld the verdict given by the trial court on 30 April 2014. The Bangladesh Supreme Court upheld the sentences of the lower court but excused AKM Mohiuddin Ahmed, Bazlul Huda, Syed Faruque Rahman, and Sultan Shahriar Rashid Khan. The four were executed after being sentenced to death in the case over the assassination of Sheikh Mujibur Rahman and the 15 August 1975 Bangladesh coup d'état. Hossain is currently a fugitive.

References

Living people
Bangladesh Army officers
Assassination of Sheikh Mujibur Rahman
People convicted of murder by Bangladesh
Year of birth missing (living people)